Cracknell is a surname. Notable people with the surname include:

Adam Cracknell (born 1985), Canadian professional ice hockey left winger
Carrie Cracknell (born 1980), British theatre director, artistic director of the Gate Theatre, London
Charles Cracknell MBE (1915–1997), British classical bassoonist and pedagogue
Charles Cracknell (civil servant), the Youth Enterprise and Employment manager, Hull City Council, Yorkshire
Chris Cracknell (rugby union) (born 1984), rugby union player
David Cracknell, media and reputation management expert and former journalist in the United Kingdom
Dick Cracknell (footballer), English footballer
James Cracknell, OBE (born 1972), British rowing champion and double Olympic gold medalist and adventurer
Kenneth Cracknell (born 1935), British specialist in interfaith dialogue and the Christian theology of religions
Leonard Cracknell (1941–1998), British television, radio, film and theatre actor, mainly during the 1960s and 1970s
Richard Cracknell (born 1929), English rugby league footballer of the 1950s
Ruth Cracknell (1925–2002), Australian theatre and television character actress
Sarah Cracknell (born 1967), English pop singer who fronts the band Saint Etienne
Vernon Cracknell (1912–1989), New Zealand politician